Dulce Veneno (English: Sweet Poison) is the 14th studio album by Mexican pop singer Mijares. This album was released on 10 December 2002 and it was produced by Mijares himself, Pancho Ruiz and Guillermo Gil. He worked with songwriters like Reyli Barba, Leonel García, Arturo Castro and Aureo Baqueiro; Mijares also wrote some songs.

Track listing
Tracks:
 Acércate
 Buscaré un Lugar
 Mi única Verdad
 Dame Tus Alas
 Que Fue
 Yo Sin Ti
 Dulce Veneno
 Quédate
 Terminas, Empiezo
 A Ver
 Huracán
 Solo

References

2002 albums
Manuel Mijares albums